Amarsham is a 1978 Indian Malayalam film, directed by I. V. Sasi and produced by A. Raghunath. The film stars Prem Nazir, Sheela, KPAC Lalitha and Jose Prakash in the lead roles. The film has musical score by G. Devarajan.

Cast
Prem Nazir 
Sheela 
KPAC Lalitha 
Jose Prakash 
Bahadoor 
Kunchan 
Kuthiravattam Pappu 
Ravikumar 
Vidhubala

Soundtrack
The music was composed by G. Devarajan and the lyrics were written by Chirayinkeezhu Ramakrishnan Nair.

References

External links
 

1978 films
1970s Malayalam-language films
Films directed by I. V. Sasi